Ataura District is one of thirty-four districts of the Jauja Province, located in the Department of Junín in Peru. The district was created in March 27, 1935, during the presidency of Óscar R. Benavides. It encompasses an area of 5.9 km2.

References